Kesha is a township nestled in the mountains of Yongshun County, northwestern Hunan province. There are ten villages which are in its jurisdiction.

See also 
 List of township-level divisions of Hunan

External links
 Kesha Township Official Government website 

Townships of Hunan
Divisions of Yongshun County